Kostov Island is the 380 m long in south-north direction and 210 m wide rocky island with surface area of  lying in Lewthwaite Strait off the east coast of Coronation Island in the South Orkney Islands, Antarctica. It is "named after Captain Kosyo Kostov, commander of the ocean fishing trawler Afala of the Bulgarian company Ocean Fisheries – Burgas during its fishing trips to Antarctic waters off South Georgia from March to August 1985 and in the 1985/86 season. The Bulgarian fishermen, along with those of the Soviet Union, Poland and East Germany are the pioneers of modern Antarctic fishing industry."

Location
British mapping in 1963.

Maps
 British Antarctic Territory: South Orkney Islands. Scale 1:100000 topographic map. DOS Series 510. Surrey, England: Directorate of Overseas Surveys, 1963
 Antarctic Digital Database (ADD). Scale 1:250000 topographic map of Antarctica. Scientific Committee on Antarctic Research (SCAR). Since 1993, regularly upgraded and updated

Notes

References
 Kostov Island. SCAR Composite Gazetteer of Antarctica

External links
 Kostov Island. Copernix satellite image

 

Islands of the South Orkney Islands
Ocean Fisheries – Burgas Co
Bulgaria and the Antarctic